Totoquihuatzli I was a tlatoani (ruler) of the pre-Columbian Tepanec altepetl (ethnic state) of Tlacopan in the Valley of Mexico.

It was during the reign of Totoquihuatztli I that the foundation of the Triple Alliance was formed, including the distribution of territory and share of tribute between Tlacopan, Tenochtitlan and Texcoco.

In 1440 Totoquihuatzin I participated in the selection of Moctezuma I to succeed Itzcoatl. Then again in 1466 Totoquihuatzli I participated in the selection of Axayacatl to succeed Moctezuma I as the next tlatoani of Tenochtitlan.

Notes

References

Tlatoque